Jerago con Orago is a town and a comune (municipality) in the Province of Varese in the Italian region Lombardy, located about  northwest of Milan and about  south of Varese. It is formed by two main centres of Orago and Jerago (which houses the municipal seat), sharing a 13th-century castle.

It is served by Cavaria-Oggiona-Jerago railway station.

References

Cities and towns in Lombardy